Billie Montgomery is a former Irish international lawn bowler.

He won a bronze medal in the fours at the 1986 Commonwealth Games in Edinburgh with Ernie Parkinson, William Watson and Roy McCune.

References

Living people
Male lawn bowls players from Northern Ireland
Bowls players at the 1986 Commonwealth Games
Commonwealth Games bronze medallists for Northern Ireland
Commonwealth Games medallists in lawn bowls
Year of birth missing (living people)
Medallists at the 1986 Commonwealth Games